Series 26 of University Challenge ran between 12 November 1996 and 4 June 1997.

Results
 Winning teams are highlighted in bold.
 Teams with green scores (winners) returned in the next round, while those with red scores (losers) were eliminated.
 Teams with orange scores have lost, but survived as highest scoring losers.
 A score in italics indicates a match decided on a tie-breaker question.

First round

Second round

Quarter-finals

Semi-finals

Final

 The trophy and title were awarded to the Magdalen team comprising Colin Andress, Gwilym Thear, Jim Adams and Alison Reeves.
 The trophy was presented by Germaine Greer.

References

External links
 University Challenge Homepage
 Blanchflower Results Table

1996
1996 British television seasons
1997 British television seasons